Judith Inglese is an American artist known for her large public ceramic murals and her illustrations in  the children's books of Dedie King. She is the daughter of Frank Caplan and Theresa Caplan, the founders of Creative Playthings.

Life and education
Juditih Inglese received her Bachelor of Arts from Sarah Lawrence College and studied ceramics and sculpture at the Accademia de Belle Arti, Rome and School of the Museum of Fine Arts, Boston. She lives in Leverett, Massachusetts.

Ceramic murals
Inglese creates ceramic tile murals that are in bas-relief. Inglese hand-cuts and glazes the ceramic tiles, fitting together the tiles like a puzzle upon placing the mural in its final location. She has created major public art works for the National Zoo in Washington, D.C., as well as at hospitals, recreational facilities, libraries, and other public venues throughout the country.

Public artworks by Inglese include:
 1983: Play is Children's Work, Fletcher-Maynard Academy, Cambridge, Massachusetts
 1983: Untitled ceramic frieze, Rockville Municipal Swim Center, Rockville, Maryland
 1992 Ceramic frieze spanning three corridors, Memorial Elementary School, East Hampton, Connecticut
 1984: I'd Hammer Out Love Graham & Parks School, Cambridge, Massachusetts
 1996:  A Community Honored, four ceramic murals at the Tyler/Vernon (DART station) of Dallas Area Rapid Transit, Dallas Texas
 1999: Every Person Has a Song to Sing, Rockville Senior Center, Rockville, Maryland
 2004: Two ceramic murals at the entrance to the Martin County Health Department, Stuart, Florida
 2007: Ceramic frieze, Headquarters of Redlands Christian Migrant Association, Immokalee, Florida
 2009: The Current of Life is Ever Onward, 3 ceramic murals, Rockville Town Square, Rockville, Maryland
 2010: Landscape,  ceramic frieze, Brevard County Children's Services, Viera, Florida

Book illustrations
Inglese has worked with children's author Dedie King to create a series of books that depict cultural elements of a specific country as seen through the eyes of a child narrator, called I See the Sun. The books are published in English and in the language of the country the child lives in, including Mandarin Chinese. The books began being published in 2010 by Satya House Publications. In 2010, I See the Sun in China won an award from Creative Child magazine as well as the Teachers Choice Award for the Family.

Books illustrated by Inglese include:
King, Dedie, I See the Sun in Afghanistan. Hardwick: Satya House Publications (2011). 
King, Dedie, I See the Sun in China. Hardwick: Satya House Publications (2010). 
King, Dedie. I See the Sun in Nepal. Hardwick: Satya House Publications (2010). 
King, Dedie. I See the Sun in Russia. Hardwick: Satya House Publications (2012).

References and further reading

Inglese, Judith. "Report: the Hands and Hearts Family Tile Making project." Arts in Psychotherapy 27:4 (2000): 273-276.

External links
Official website
I See the Sun book series

21st-century ceramists
American ceramists
American women illustrators
American muralists
American women ceramists
American children's book illustrators
Living people
People from Leverett, Massachusetts
Artists from New York City
Sarah Lawrence College alumni
21st-century American women artists
Women muralists
Year of birth missing (living people)